Dorit Kemsley (born July 14, 1976) is an American fashion designer and television personality. She is best known as a main cast member on the reality TV show The Real Housewives of Beverly Hills, appearing in that capacity since the show's seventh season. In 2017, she founded the swimwear brand, Beverly Beach by Dorit.

Early life
She was born in Connecticut in the city of Woodbridge to Jewish parents: her father Shalom Lemel is Israeli, and her mother Rachel was born in Morocco. After graduating from Quinnipiac University with a degree in marketing, design, and communication, she traveled in Europe. She settled in Italy for 10 years, and worked for a global swimwear company.

Career
Kemsley developed the swimwear line Beverly Beach and bridal collection Nektaria. She is a current cast member, joining in 2016, of The Real Housewives of Beverly Hills. Kemsley has since starred in a main role for 6 seasons. In 2019, Kemsley appeared as a guest on Million Dollar Listing Los Angeles alongside her husband, where they listed their home for sale.

Personal life
She is married to Paul Kemsley, and they have two children. The couple owns a 9,000-square-foot home in Encino, California that they purchased for $6.47M. In October 2021, Kemsley, alone with her two children, was robbed at gunpoint at her Encino home by three male burglars.

References

External links
 Dorit Kemsley at IMDb

1976 births
Living people
American fashion designers
American Jews
People from Connecticut
The Real Housewives of Beverly Hills